Stubbins is an industrial village in the southern part of the Rossendale Valley, Lancashire, England.

It is half a mile north of Ramsbottom town centre on the A676 between Bolton and Edenfield.  For local government purposes, it receives services from Rossendale Borough Council and Lancashire County Council.  Nearby are the hamlets of Chatterton and Strongstry.

It is part of the Rossendale and Darwen constituency, with Jake Berry having been the Member of Parliament since 2010.

Description
Much of the land to the west of the village is in the care of the National Trust and consists of hillside pasture and woodland leading up to Holcombe Moor and Peel Tower.

The adjoining parkland (at Chatterton) was given to the people of the district of Ramsbottom as a peace memorial by the Porritt family. The village public house (now private offices - redeveloped in 2006), the Corner Pin, was originally the Railway Hotel, recalling the days when the village was still served by Stubbins railway station. This branch of the line is still used by the East Lancashire Railway to run regular weekend steam services between Rawtenstall and Bury. The second line now provides an attractive walk to Irwell Vale. Col. A.T. Porritt gave much of the nearby countryside to the National Trust in memory of his son, Richard, who was killed in the Second World War.

History
Stubbins has a long history; its name (see below) looks back to the Middle Ages when people were carving new farms out of the heavily wooded countryside. Like other communities in Rossendale, Stubbins grew in the Industrial Revolution.  The change to an industrial village began towards the end of the 18th century when a calico printworks was built on the site now occupied by Georgia-Pacific.

The 19th century owners of the printworks began to give the village its present shape by building rows of terraced houses for their workers. The other main employers were the Porritt family who built Stubbins Vale Mill in 1851 and the Ramsbottom Spinning and Manufacturing Co., a co-operative of working men, whose 1861 factory was christened Union Mill. Much of Stubbins Vale Mill was demolished in the 1970s, but the old weaving sheds were taken over as the administrative head office of TNT, the international carriers.

Etymology
Stubbing 1563. Old English meaning 'a place with tree stumps', implying a place from which many trees have been cleared.

References

External links

 

Villages in Lancashire
Geography of the Borough of Rossendale